Lăzăreni is a commune in Bihor County, Crișana, Romania with a population of 3,233 people. It is composed of eight villages: Bicăcel (Pusztabikács), Calea Mare (Magyargyepes), Cărăndeni (Nagykáránd), Cărănzel (Kiskáránd), Gepiș (Oláhgyepes), Gruilung (Hosszúliget), Lăzăreni and Miheleu (Méhelő).

Natives
 Dumitru Cuc (1928–2019), wrestler

References

Communes in Bihor County
Localities in Crișana